James Francis Bernard, 4th Earl of Bandon, KP (12 September 1850 – 18 May 1924), was a British Deputy Lieutenant in Ireland and Representative Peer. Lord Bandon was a cousin of the Earl of Midleton, who was head of the southern Irish Unionist Alliance at the time of the Anglo-Irish War, 1919–21.

Estate

He reorganised his various County Cork estates by way of settlement in 1876 and further in 1895 and 1896 including the mortgaging of the lands to his agents Richard Wheeler Doherty, and the appointment of George and John Jones and Doherty as his attorneys. He was appointed High Sheriff of County Cork for 1875.

IRA hostilities

The family seat, Castle Bernard, near Bandon, County Cork, was one of the great houses burned during the Anglo-Irish War in the early 1920s by the Irish Republican Army under Sean Hales on 21 June 1921. The home was burned as a counter-reprisal measure against British policy of burning the homes of suspected Irish republicans.

Lord Bandon was kidnapped and held hostage for three weeks being released on 12 July. The IRA threatened to have him executed if the British went ahead with executing IRA prisoners. During his captivity, Bandon reportedly coolly played cards with his captors, who seem to have treated him fairly well.  Reportedly, Lord Bandon would give one of his captors, Daniel (Dan) O'Leary (also known an Leabhair, Irish for 'Book', based on the fact he was so well read), money each day for Leabhair to travel from the house in Kilcolman townland, to Slatterys pub in Ahiohill to purchase Clonakilty Wrastler (a local beer).

See also
List of kidnappings
List of solved missing person cases

References
Registry of Deeds, Dublin, 1876, 1895 and 1896
Bandon Historical Journal no 12 (1996)

References

1850 births
1920s missing person cases
1924 deaths
Earls of Bandon
Formerly missing people
High Sheriffs of County Cork
Irish representative peers
Kidnapped British people
Kidnapped politicians
Knights of St Patrick
Lord-Lieutenants of Cork
People of the Irish War of Independence
Politicians from County Cork